St Benedict's College is a secondary school in Randalstown, County Antrim, Northern Ireland. It is an 11-16 Catholic, all ability, co-educational college which mainly serves families from the parishes of Randalstown and Antrim.

History
The college is a result of the amalgamation of St Malachy's High School, Antrim and St Olcan's High School in Randalstown.  This was agreed in March 2006. The combined school was renamed as St Benedict's College. St Malachy's High School was demolished and a rebuilding programme began on the St Olcan's site around the same time to develop new facilities.

References

Catholic secondary schools in Northern Ireland
Secondary schools in County Antrim